Joliet West High School, along with Joliet Central, comprises district 204 Joliet Township High School district in Joliet, Illinois. West's mascot is the Tiger.

Construction and expansion 
The school was originally constructed in 1964, one year after its identical sister school Joliet East, and has since been expanded four times. The first addition, completed in the early 1980s, added a bookstore to the cafeteria, additional space around the maintenance area, a multi-purpose room by the gymnasiums (primarily used for dance and wrestling), six additional classrooms, and a greenhouse. That greenhouse was later torn down.

The second and third additions were completed as two consecutive projects, adding several additional classrooms, a new band room, cafeteria, conference room, dean's offices, and student commons area. The first phase broke ground on November 4, 2001 and was completed the following school year. The second phase began during the 2002–03 year and was open for fall 2003 classes.

A field house was built in late 2007, and an additional building housing science classes was constructed in 2011.

In 2017, construction began on another smaller section of the building adding a Police Liaison Office, a conference room, and a security entrance. This project would be completed in Spring 2018. The project also added another connection from the main building to the fine-arts building, decreasing hallway traffic congestion. Though efforts are still being made to battle this ongoing problem.

Separation of schools 

During the 2008 - 2009 school year, Central and West began to again divide the schools' athletic programs, allowing the West mascot to become the Tiger once again, leaving Central as the Steelmen. The split began with Joliet's freshman football team dividing. As of the 2010 - 2011 school year, Joliet Central and Joliet West have their own, entirely independent sports programs.

Notable alumni 
Charlie Adams, drummer/percussionist (Chameleon, Yanni)
John Barrowman, television and Broadway actor (Doctor Who, Torchwood)
Jimmy Chamberlin, drummer (The Smashing Pumpkins)
Adrianne Curry - model, TV personality
Andy Dick - actor-comedian (The Andy Dick Show)
Janina Gavankar - actress, musician (The L Word, True Blood)
Randall Kleck - martial artist
Eric Parker - NFL player for San Diego Chargers
Steve Parris - pitcher for four MLB teams
Doug Pinnick - musician, King's X
Anthony Rapp - actor (Rent)

References

External links 
Official website

Public high schools in Illinois
Education in Joliet, Illinois
Schools in Will County, Illinois
1964 establishments in Illinois
Educational institutions established in 1964